Listography is a series of journals created by Lisa Nola and published by Chronicle Books. It is also a web application which allows users to create and share lists.  Through list-making, users can shape an autobiography and create references for themselves and others. Listography.com and the Listography books were featured in Boing Boing Television's premiere as a place to capture one's autobiography in lists.

The term Listography, coined by Lisa Nola, is defined as an autobiography made up entirely of listed details from your life.  Some common types of lists are:  autobiographical, favorites, motivational, wishlists, to do lists, catalogues, and photo lists.

With over a million copies sold, the first Listography book was published in October 2007. A Listography tabletop game was released in 2016. The Listography series has been translated into six languages and the term "listography" is trademarked.

List of titles
 Listography Journal: Your Life in Lists (2007)
 My Listography: My Amazing Life in Lists (2008)
 Love Listography: Your Love Life in Lists (2008)
 Music Listography Journal: Your Life in (Play)Lists (2009)
 Friends Listography: Our Lives in Lists (2010)
 My Future Listography: All I Hope to Do in Lists (2011)
 Film Listography: Your Life in Movie Lists (2012)
 Parenthood Listography: My Kid in Lists (2013)
 Travel Listography: Exploring the World in Lists (2013)
 Literary Listography: My Reading Life in Lists (2014)
 Food Listography: My Delicious Life in Lists (2015)
 Listography: The Game (2016)
 Spirit Listography: My Inner Self in Lists (2016)
 One List a Day (2019)
 Date Night In (2020)
 Mini Memoir (2022)

References

External links
Listography.com

Media coverage
 "Obsessions Making the List" from CNN Entertainment (December 23, 2011)
 "First Things First" from Boston Globe (August 25, 2008)
 Books That Are More Than Books from Pop candy (October 5, 2007)
 Listography:  Songs They'll Play at Your Funeral from Wired (August 31, 2007)

American social networking websites